The 2003 San Jose Earthquakes season was the eighth season of the team's existence, and saw the franchise win its second MLS Cup.

Squad

Current squad 
As of December 26, 2012.

Club

Management

Other information

Competitions

Major League Soccer

Matches 

(OT) = Overtime

MLS Cup Playoffs

MLS Cup

U.S. Open Cup

CONCACAF Champions Cup

Source:

Standings 

The top four teams in each conference make the playoffs.								
x = Playoff Berth

References

External links
San Jose Earthquakes season stats | sjearthquakes.com
San Jose Earthquakes Game Results | Soccerstats.us
San Jose Earthquakes 100 Greatest Goals 2003 | Youtube

2003
San Jose Earthquakes
San Jose Earthquakes
San Jose Earthquakes
MLS Cup champion seasons